Alexander Helmut Schulz (born 1991) is a German professional tightrope walker, multiple highline world record holder, and keynote speaker. Schulz is internationally known for pioneering the first walks of several slacklines and world records at extraordinary locations. In his most dangerous project to date, "LavaLine", he crossed the active volcano Mount Yasur on a highline in April 2020 on the South Sea island of Tanna, Vanuatu.

Life 
Alexander Schulz grew up in Rosenheim as part of a family that valued outdoor and sporting activities. During his early childhood he joined his father, Raimon Schulz, on numerous adventures and expeditions. His hobbies included sports such as hiking, gymnastics and ice hockey as well as white-water kayaking, climbing, skiing, caving and canyoning. Before slacklining became a trend sport in the early 2010s, Schulz had put up his first slacklines. In June 2011 he walked his first highline and found entry to the slackline community. During this time, he met many well-known people of the slackline scene, including future teammate and business partner Johannes Olszewski.

Since graduating high school in 2011, Alexander Schulz has devoted himself to slacklining full-time. Together with Olszewski and three other friends he founded the collective "One Inch Dreams" in early 2012. One Inch Dreams started as a slackline portal, and over the course of many successful projects and world records the company developed into a creative agency and film producer.

Schulz also gives lectures on the topics of risk management and coping strategies, as well as the conscious handling of fear. In addition to his daily training, regular yoga practice, mental training and breathing exercises help him to carry out his projects in terms of overcoming fear and stress. He is a regular guest in film and television, reporting about his expeditions and projects in Galileo (Fernsehsendung)|Galileo, Bayerischen Rundfunk, Deutsche Welle, SAT1, WDR, ZDF, RTL, MDR, SWR and France 3. Schulz shares his expertise with highline beginners in workshops in Rosenheim as well as in his chosen home of Innsbruck.

Career 
Schulz began his career as a professional athlete in 2011 when he signed his first sponsorship contract and set his first records. On June 4, 2011, he broke the then world record with a 140-meter-long waterline in the Salzburg Land. At the Natural Games in Millau, France in mid-June, 2011, he crossed the longest highland in the world at the time with 115 meters in both directions (onsight fullman).

At the end of 2011, Schulz constructed the first so-called "Space-Highline" (also known as Space-Line) during a two-month highline trip in the western United States, the forerunner of the Spacenet slackline structures that are occasionally found today (as of 2020). On the same trip, Schulz beat his record by four meters when he climbed the 119 meter long highline over the Consumnes River Gorge (California). In the following years, various world records and special projects followed.

Together with his teammate Niklas Winter, he gained a lot of media attention in the German-speaking world with a highline stunt at Zugspitze Glacier Cable Car in July 2014.

With the crossing of the 375m long highline The Ghost Inside in Yangshuo, China, he doubled the length of his old world record.

On the occasion of his world record in China, Schulz was invited as a distinguished guest to the Opening Day of the German Embassy in Beijing. With a slackline show, he symbolically connected the capital of China with the Federal Republic of Germany. A few days later, with the help of his team, Schulz managed to walk a 610-meter-long slackline in the Gobi Desert, breaking the world record for the longest slackline over ground (longline).

In 2016, Schulz failed in his attempt to walk over a 650-meter-long polyamide highline over the volcano Roches Tuilieres et Sanadoire in the French Auvergne. The attempt had to be interrupted because gusts of wind with wind peaks of over 120 km/h caused amplitudes of up to 100 meters in the highline, making the crossing impossible. The project was successful one month later and Schulz broke the world record for the longest polyamide highline.

In December 2016, Schulz crossed the world's longest and highest highline in urban surroundings in Mexico City. The slackline was installed between the city's highest buildings (Torre Reforma and Torre BBVA Bancomer) over the Paseo de la Reforma as part of a film production.

In October 2018, Schulz and Olszewski produced the key visual for the Deutschlandjahr 2018/19 in the USA together with One Inch Dreams. The symbolic image was created as part of the film production BuildingBridges, which was commissioned by the German Foreign Office, the Goethe Institute and the Federation of German Industries as part of the initiative WunderbarTogether.

On April 15, 2020, Alexander Schulz and his Brazilian colleague Rafael Bridi succeeded in crossing the first highline over an active volcano, Mount Yasur on the island of Tanna (Vanuatu). The athletes wore gas masks to protect themselves from the toxic sulfur vapors at the crater. According to Schulz, the biggest challenge were the shockwaves caused by the lava eruptions, which disturbed the athletes' sense of balance. The expedition lasted almost two months because the outbreak of the worldwide COVID-19 pandemic and the following local lockdown of Vanuatu significantly impacted the undertaking.

Slackline world records and other achievements

World records in main categories

World records in sub-categories

Other achievements and personal accomplishments

Literature 

 Roanne van Voorst: Alles onder controle. Schuyt & Co Brandt, 2016, .
 Alexander Schulz: Stille ist mein innerer Anker. In. Manu Theobald: stille ist. Adeo Publishing house, Asslar 2020, .

External links 

 Homepage Alexander Schulz

References 

World record holders
1991 births
Living people